WFIA-FM (94.7 FM) is a Christian talk radio station in the Louisville, Kentucky metropolitan area. It is owned by the Word Media Group.

On December 22, 2016, Salem Media Group announced that it would hand operation of its Louisville radio stations, including WFIA, to Word Broadcasting Network (also known as Word Media Group) under a time brokerage agreement. Word ended WFIA-FM's simulcast on WFIA (900 AM), with the AM station changing to a simulcast of Word's Contemporary Christian station WJIE-FM. On February 10, 2020, Word Broadcasting announced that it would take advantage of the option in its agreement to acquire the stations from Salem for $4 million; the sale was completed on May 25, 2022.

References

External links

FIA
FIA-FM
Radio stations established in 1994
1994 establishments in Indiana